The scalene tubercle is a small projection that runs along the medial border of the first rib between two grooves, which travel anteriorly for the subclavian artery and posteriorly for the subclavian vein. It projects outward medially, and is the site of insertion for scalenus anterior.

See also
 Scalene muscle
 first rib

References

Bones of the thorax